Take It Like a Man is the second album by the American heavy metal band Butcher Babies. It was released on August 21, 2015 through Century Media Records.

History
On November 5, 2014, the band announced that they had begun work on their upcoming second studio album. The band completed work on the album on April 3, 2015. The band revealed that the album was a return to their thrash metal roots. The band also revealed the new album will feature a rerecorded version of their first single from 2010, "Blonde Girls All Look the Same".

On June 10, 2015, the band revealed the title of their upcoming album to be Take It Like a Man, and also released the first single of the album, "Monsters Ball", despite original plans to release "Never Go Back" as the lead single. The band revealed that the record label and management expressed dislike for the album title and artwork, and that the band had to fight to keep them. Regarding the album title, vocalist Carla Harvey said:

On June 26, the band released a music video for the lead single, "Monsters Ball". On July 11, the band released the song "Never Go Back" as the second single of the album. On October 19, the band released a music video for the song "Igniter".

Track listing

Personnel
Butcher Babies
Heidi Shepherd – vocals
Carla Harvey – vocals
Jason Klein – bass
Henry Flury – guitar
Chrissy Warner – drums

Production
Logan Mader – production

Charts

References

2015 albums
Butcher Babies albums